Joseph Abel Francis Jr.  (1923–1997) was an American Catholic bishop. He served as an auxiliary bishop of the Archdiocese of Newark from 1976 to 1995.

Biography
Born on September 30, 1923, in Lafayette, Louisiana, Joseph Francis was the brother of the educator and scholar Norman Francis. Joseph was ordained a priest for the Society of the Divine Word on October 7, 1950. On May 3, 1976, Pope Paul VI appointed him as the Titular Bishop of Valliposita and Auxiliary Bishop of Newark. He was consecrated by Archbishop Peter Gerety on June 25, 1976. The principal co-consecrators were Archbishop Emeritus Thomas Boland of Newark and Auxiliary Bishop Harold Perry of New Orleans. Francis continued to serve as an auxiliary bishop until his resignation was accepted by Pope John Paul II on June 30, 1995. He died at the age of 73 on September 1, 1997.

Bishop Joseph Abel Francis was an outspoken Civil Rights Leader and was one of the first in the Catholic church to openly speak out against racism.  Bishop Francis broke numerous barriers.  When he was ordained in 1950, he become only the 35th African American to gain that stature in the church hierarchy. As only the fourth African American Roman Catholic bishop in the country, and the first in the Northeast region of the United States, in the 1970's he led the Black Catholic Clergy Caucus a fraternal organization dedicated to the spiritual, theological, educational, and ministerial growth of Black Catholic clergy.  Bishop Francis noted that his appointment as bishop was the "the second great challenge" he faced during his life.  The other was his founding of Verbum Dei High School in the Watts section of Los Angeles, a predominantly African American community.  One of his other important works was his pastoral letter of racism which was published in 1979. To date, Joseph A. Francis remains the first and only African American bishop in the Newark Archdiocese.

References

Resources and Links 
Seton Hall University, Monsignor Noe Field Archives & Special Collections Center, Joseph A. Francis papers,  Identifier # ADN 0003-011

1923 births
1997 deaths
People from Lafayette, Louisiana
Divine Word Missionaries Order
20th-century American Roman Catholic titular bishops
Catholics from Louisiana
African-American Roman Catholic bishops
20th-century African-American people
St. Augustine Seminary (Bay St. Louis)
African-American Catholic consecrated religious